Marc Gruber (born 1972 in Munich) is a management scholar  and researcher specialized in technology commercialization. He is a professor at EPFL (École Polytechnique Fédérale de Lausanne), and holds the Chair of Entrepreneurship and Technology Commercialization at EPFL's College of Management of Technology. In 2022, he was made Chief Editor of the Academy of Management Journal. In 2016, he has been named among the five most influential researchers worldwide in entrepreneurship research.

Career 
Gruber received a Master's degree in management from the University of St. Gallen (HSG) 1995. Staying at HSG, he wrote a PhD thesis on "Erfolgsfaktoren des Wirtschaftens von KMU im Zeitablauf: dargestellt an Beispielen aus der deutschen Nahrungs- und Genussmittelindustrie" (Success factors of SMEs over time: illustrated by examples from the German food and luxury food industry) and graduated in 2000. He then joined the Ludwig Maximilian University of Munich (LMU) as senior researcher and lecturer, to establish the university's entrepreneurship center and to pursue his habilitation thesis. He obtained his habilitation from LMU's School of Management in 2005 for his research entitled "Marketingplanung von wagniskapitalfinanzierten Unternehmensgründungen – eine theoretische und empirische Analyse" (Marketing planning of venture capital-financed start-ups - a theoretical and empirical analysis). During that time he was vice-director of the Institute of Innovation Research, Technology Management and Entrepreneurship and established LMU’s Center for Entrepreneurship. He has held several visiting scholar posts at the Wharton School (2004), and at the University of Pennsylvania (1999 and 2004). He was also a visiting professor at the Business School of Imperial College London (2015).

In 2005, Gruber joined EPF and since the has been the Chair of Entrepreneurship and Technology Commercialization (ENTC), first as an Assistant Professor and was promoted as an Associate Professor in 2008. Since 2011, Gruber is a full professor at EPFL's College of Management of Technology. From 2017 to 2020, he was Vice President for Innovation at EPFL.

Research 

Gruber's group focuses his research on the fields of entrepreneurship, technology commercialization, innovation, and strategic management.

Together with Sharon Tal, he created the Market Opportunity Navigator, a tool that support firms in market opportunity identification and exploitation. The tool is used by more than 50,000 companies and has been adopted as the 4th tool in the lean start-up tool-set.

Gruber's research was featured in several news outlets: Bilan, Le Temps, Voice of FinTech podcast, and Neue Zürcher Zeitung. From 2001 to 2003, he wrote for the column Start-Up for the Frankfurter Allgemeine Zeitung.

Distinctions 
He is the recipient of the TUM Research Excellence Award from the European Academy of Management (2012), the Thought Leader Award of the Entrepreneurship Division at the Academy of Management (2009, 2010, 2012), and the Mentor Award of the Entrepreneurship Division at the Academy of Management (2019).

Gruber acted as associate (2013 - 2016) and as deputy editor (2017 - 2020), then Editor-in-Chief (since 2022) at the Academy of Management Journal, the world's highest ranked journal for empirical research in management.

He is a member of the Academy of Management, and of the Verband der Hochschullehrer für Betriebswirtschaft.

Selected works

Not to be confused with 
He should not be confused with the fictional character MacGruber, who was created by SNL writer Jorma Taccone.

References

External links 
 
 Website of the Chair of Entrepreneurship and Technology Commercialization
 Website of Where to Play - The Market Opportunity Navigator

Living people
Academic staff of the École Polytechnique Fédérale de Lausanne
1972 births
University of St. Gallen alumni
German Scientists